Lago della Vecchia is a lake in the Prealps of the Province of Biella in the Piedmont region of Italy. At an average elevation of 6,552 m, its surface area is 0.06448 km².

References

Lakes of Piedmont
Province of Biella
Biellese Alps